Dawn is a Swedish extreme metal band from Linköping, formed by Frederik Söderberg in 1990; while they disbanded for nearly a decade, they have reconvened and are active today. The band has released eight recordings, including two full-length albums. The next album, 'The Fourfold Furnace', was announced as early as 2003, and finally scheduled to be issued in 2008. However, as of 2020, the album has still not been released.

Members
Current line-up
Tomas Asklund – drums (Gorgoroth, ex-Dissection, ex-Dark Funeral)
Henke Forss – vocals (Retaliation)
Fredrik Söderberg – guitar (Cranium)
Philip Von Segebaden – bass (Cranium)

Former members
Andreas Fullmestad – guitar
Dennis Karlsson – bass
Karsten Larsson – drums (Mithotyn, Falconer)
Stefan Lundgren – guitar
Jocke Pettersson – drums
Lars Tängmark – bass

Discography
Demo 1 (demo, 1992)
Apparition (demo, 1993)
Promotional Demo (demo, 1993)
The Dark Light/The Eternal Forest (split LP with Pyghomgertum, Bellphegot Records, 1994)
Nær Solen Gar Niþer For Evogher (Necropolis Records, 1994)
Sorgh på Svarte Vingar Fløgh (Necropolis, 1996)
Slaughtersun (Crown of the Triarchy) (Necropolis, 1998)

References

External links
Dawn homepage

Swedish black metal musical groups
Swedish melodic death metal musical groups
Blackened death metal musical groups
Musical groups established in 1990